The 2013 San Jose State Spartans football team represented San José State University in the 2013 NCAA Division I FBS football season. The Spartans were led by first year head coach Ron Caragher and played their home games at Spartan Stadium. The Spartans were first-year members of the Mountain West Conference in the West Division. They finished the season 6–6, 5-3 in Mountain West play to finish in a tie for third place in the West Division. Despite being bowl eligible, the Spartans were not invited to a bowl game.

Personnel
After Mike MacIntyre resigned as head coach at San Jose State to accept the head coaching job at the University of Colorado Boulder, San Jose State hired University of San Diego head coach Ron Caragher on December 17, 2012, however, defensive coordinator Kent Baer served as interim head coach for San Jose State's victory in the 2012 Military Bowl on December 27, 2012. Several of Caragher's assistant coaches from San Diego followed Caragher to San Jose State, including Jimmie Dougherty, Donte Williams, and Joe Staab. Kenwick Thompson, a defensive assistant coach for San Jose State from 2001 to 2006 and for Cal from 2007 to 2012, returned to San Jose State as defensive coordinator.

Returning starters

Offense

Defense

Special teams

Schedule

Reference :

Game summaries

Sacramento State

Scoring Summary

1st Quarter

SJSU—Lopez 37 yd field goal 8:30  SJSU 3–0

2nd Quarter

SJSU—Jones 31 yd pass from Fales (Lopez kick is good) 13:10  SJSU 10–0

SJSU—Grigsby 15 yd pass from Fales (Lopez kick is good) 0:54 SJSU 17–0

3rd Quarter

SJSU—Simpson 54 yd run (Lopez kicked is good) 8:20 SJSU 24–0

4th Quarter

No scoring

at Stanford

1st Quarter

STAN-Cajuste 40 yd pass from Hogan (Williamson kick is good) 10:12  STAN 7–0

at Minnesota

Utah State

at Hawaii

at Colorado State

Wyoming

at UNLV

San Diego State

at Nevada

Navy

Fresno State

After the season

Awards
Spartan quarterback David Fales won the Alan B. Simpkins Most Valuable Player Award at the San Jose State football awards banquet in December 2013. At the same event, Keith Smith won the Outstanding Defensive Player award, and Chandler Jones the Outstanding Offensive Player award.

Conference
Bené Benwikere, Chandler Jones, and Keith Smith were named to the All-MWC first team. Second-team All-MWC picks were David Fales, Nicholas Kaspar, and Austin Lopez. Billy Freeman and Ryan Jones were honorable mention All-MWC selections, and the MWC also named Tyler Winston the Freshman of the Year.

A record 16 San Jose State football players were selected to the Academic All-MWC Team for the Fall 2013 semester.

National
Chandler Jones and Bené Benwikere were invited to the 2014 East–West Shrine Game. David Fales was invited to the 2014 Senior Bowl and became the first San Jose State quarterback invited to the Senior Bowl.

Coaching changes
After Vanderbilt hired Kenwick Thompson as defensive coordinator shortly after the close of the 2013 season, San Jose State hired Greg Robinson to replace Thompson. Robinson was previously defensive coordinator at Texas in 2013, and his experience includes defensive coordinator of the Denver Broncos from 1995 to 2000, including the teams that won Super Bowls XXXII and XXXIII.

Keith Carter replaced offensive line coach Hank Fraley, who left for the Minnesota Vikings. Carter previously served as offensive quality control coach for the Super Bowl XLVIII championship winning Seattle Seahawks. Terry Malley, formerly the tight ends coach in 2013, moved to wide receivers coach for 2014 and replaced Greg Lewis, who left for Pittsburgh. Joe Staab moved from coaching safeties to outside linebackers. In addition to being offensive coordinator and quarterbacks coach, Jimmie Dougherty became assistant head coach. Graduate assistant Andrew Rolin was promoted to the full running backs coach position.

NFL Draft

In the 2014 NFL Draft, two San Jose State players were selected. Bené Benwikere was selected in the 5th round, 148th overall by the Carolina Panthers. David Fales was selected in the 6th round, 183rd overall by the Chicago Bears.

Rankings

References
General

Footnotes

San Jose State
San Jose State Spartans football seasons
San Jose State Spartans football